Agrypina (14th century) was a Lithuanian noblewoman from the Gediminids dynasty. She was a daughter of Grand Duke of Lithuania Algirdas and his first wife Maria of Vitebsk. In 1354, she married Duke of Suzdal Boris, son of Konstantin and brother of Dmitry. This is only mentioned in Suprasl Chronicle, a transcription of the first Lithuanian Chronicle. One Russian Chronicle confirms the marriage, but does not record the bride's name. That is the only reliable information available about Agrypina. Her husband attempted to take control over Nizhny Novgorod, but failed when he was opposed by Dmitri Donskoi, Prince of Moscow.

Sources 
 

Year of birth missing
Year of death missing
Gediminids
14th-century Lithuanian women
14th-century Lithuanian people
Medieval Lithuanian nobility